Francisco Castillo (9 January 1921 – 7 January 1997) was a Spanish water polo player. He competed at the 1948 Summer Olympics and the 1952 Summer Olympics.

References

1921 births
1997 deaths
Spanish male water polo players
Olympic water polo players of Spain
Water polo players at the 1948 Summer Olympics
Water polo players at the 1952 Summer Olympics
Water polo players from Barcelona
20th-century Spanish people